Wald is an unincorporated community in Cedar County, in the U.S. state of Iowa.

History
Wald was originally called Walden. The community was named for W. D. Walden, a railroad employee. A post office was established at Wald in 1896 and closed in 1898.

References

Unincorporated communities in Cedar County, Iowa
Unincorporated communities in Iowa
1896 establishments in Iowa